Tanner on Tanner is a 2004 4-part comedy miniseries. It is the sequel to the 1988 Robert Altman-directed and Garry Trudeau-written miniseries about a failed presidential candidate, Tanner '88. The sequel focuses mostly on Alex Tanner (Cynthia Nixon), a struggling filmmaker and the daughter of onetime presidential candidate Jack Tanner (Michael Murphy).

Episodes
 "Dinner at Elaine's" (October 5, 2004)
 "Boston or Bust" (October 12, 2004)
 "Alex in Wonderland" (October 19, 2004)
 "The Awful Truth" (October 26, 2004)

Plot
Alex Tanner is working on a documentary about her father's run for president in 1988. After her documentary, My Candidate, is met with an underwhelming response at an independent film festival, Robert Redford advises her that her film is lacking and that she should do follow-ups with all the people from the 1988 campaign to see what they are doing now, and get their reflections on their past roles.

Alex does just this, interviewing most of the old campaign staffers and her father before going to the 2004 Democratic Convention in Boston with her film crew to compare and contrast it with the 1988 Democratic National Convention where her father lost the nomination. Along the way, one of her crew members, Salim (Aasif Mandvi), is repeatedly stopped and frisked by police because of his Arab ethnicity. There she meets up with TJ, her father's old campaign manager, who is now advising John Kerry. While TJ provides assistance to Alex, she also advises Jack that he is being considered for a position in the administration, should Kerry win the election. She says he would need to make sure footage from Alex's documentary of him attacking the Iraq War is removed and destroyed, so as not to potentially embarrass Kerry. Jack asks Alex to remove and destroy the footage, which she considers the best part of her documentary. Alex becomes very upset and disillusioned with her father. (It is also implied that she has had a falling out with him.) She eventually destroys her whole film, looking to move on with her life.

Production
As with the first film, this film features many cameos by politicians and celebrities including Al Franken, Janeane Garofalo, Joe Lieberman, Tom Brokaw, Ron Reagan Jr., Alexandra Kerry, Michael Dukakis, Luke Macfarlane, Chris Matthews, Dee Dee Myers, Dick Gephardt, Barack Obama, Michael Moore, Steve Buscemi, Bill Clinton, Charlie Rose, Mario Cuomo and Martin Scorsese.

External links
 

2000s American television miniseries
Films directed by Robert Altman
2000s American political comedy television series
2000s American mockumentary television series
English-language television shows
2004 American television series debuts
2004 American television series endings
2000s American satirical television series
Political satirical television series
Sundance TV original programming
1988 United States Democratic presidential primaries
United States presidential nominating conventions in fiction
2004 United States presidential election
2004 United States Democratic presidential primaries
Films about elections
Political mockumentaries